Stephen Decatur (1779–1820) was an American naval commodore.

Stephen Decatur may also refer to:
 Stephen Decatur Sr. (1752–1808), American naval captain in the Revolutionary War and afterwards
 Stephen Decatur Bross or Stephen A. Decatur (1813–1888), pioneer settler in Nebraska and Colorado

See also
 Stephen Decatur High School (disambiguation)
 Maryland Route 611, also called Stephen Decatur Highway, highway in Maryland
 Stephen Decatur Middle School, Maryland